New Alexandria is a borough in Westmoreland County, Pennsylvania, United States. The population was 560 at the 2010 census.

Settled in 1760 along the banks of the Historic Loyalhanna Creek, this community began as a wagon rest stop for travelers, soldiers and militiamen during the American Revolution. New Alexandria was incorporated by an Act of Assembly passed on April 10, 1834. Formerly known as Denniston's Town, New Alexandria's population has not increased greatly over the years.

Geography
New Alexandria is located at  (40.397254, -79.423591), along U.S. Route 22 approximately midway between Pittsburgh and Johnstown.  It is also located approximately seven miles north of Latrobe.

Demographics

At the 2000 census there were 595 people, 254 households, and 186 families living in the borough. The racial makeup of the borough was 99.50% White, 0.17% Asian, and 0.34% from two or more races.
Of the 254 households 28.3% had children under the age of 18 living with them, 60.2% were married couples living together, 9.4% had a female householder with no husband present, and 26.4% were non-families. 24.0% of households were one person and 11.4% were one person aged 65 or older. The average household size was 2.34 and the average family size was 2.76.

The age distribution was 19.2% under the age of 18, 7.1% from 18 to 24, 27.6% from 25 to 44, 26.7% from 45 to 64, and 19.5% 65 or older. The median age was 43 years. For every 100 females, there were 97.7 males. For every 100 females age 18 and over, there were 94.7 males.

The median household income was $37,656 and the median family income  was $41,477. Males had a median income of $35,625 versus $26,250 for females. The per capita income for the borough was $17,893. About 2.8% of families and 4.4% of the population were below the poverty line, including 5.0% of those under age 18 and 1.8% of those age 65 or over.

Notable people
Agnes Sligh Turnbull, writer.
William Speer, pioneer missionary.

References

External links
 Official web site

Boroughs in Westmoreland County, Pennsylvania
Populated places established in 1800
Pittsburgh metropolitan area
1834 establishments in Pennsylvania